Saeed Al-Hajri (born 11 November 1950), called The King of Dunes is a Qatari rally driver.

Biography 
Al-Harji was born on 14 April in Doha, Qatar.

Al Hajri is the winner of the first two editions of the Middle East Rally Championship, he won 18 international victories in rallies (MERC 11), and is also the first Arab to win points in the European and worldwide championships of Rally.

His team was the Rothmans Porsche Rally Team from 1983 to 1986, 1987 with Audi Quattro and the Rothmans Ford Team from 1989 to 1990.

History 
 Double champion of the Middle East Rally FIA (MORC) in 1984 and 1985 in the Porsche 911 SC RS;
 Double champion of the Persian Gulf rallies in 1983 and 1984, in a Porsche 911 SC RS;
 Champion of the Middle East Rally in 1984, in a Porsche 911 SC RS;
 1983, 1984, 1985, 1987, 1989 and 1992: Rally of Qatar;
 1983, 1985 and 1986: Jordan Rally;
 1984: Rally of Dubai;
 1985: winner of Pharaoh's Rally in Egypt in a Porsche 959
 1993: Rally of Tunisia on Mitsubishi with his French co-driver Henri Magne);
 2007: Rally Transsibérie;
 2nd of the MERC Rally of Lebanon in 1988, in a Ford Sierra Cosworth with his copilot and brother Mubarak Al-Hajri;
 4th of the ERC Cyprus Rally in 1983 on Opel Ascona 400 with his copilot John Spiller;
 4th of the WRC Acropolis Rally in 1986 in a Porsche 911 SC RS with his copilot J. Spiller;
 5th of the WRC Acropolis Rally in 1985 in a Porsche 911 SC RS with his copilot J. Spiller;
 6th of Paris-Dakar rally in 2002, at age 52, on Mitsubishi with his co-driver Matthew Stevenson;
 8th of the 1989 WRC Rally of New Zealand in a Ford Sierra MK1 with his co-driver Steve Bond.

External links 
 Saeed Al-Hajri on rallyebase.nl
 Saeed Al-Hajri of rally-info.com
 Biography of Saeed Al-Hajri 1
 Biography of Saeed Al-Hajri 2

1950 births
Living people
People from Doha
Qatari rally drivers